Warren Fleet is an association football player who represented New Zealand.

Fleet made his full All Whites debut in a 1–1 draw with Indonesia on 11 October 1972 and ended his international playing career with 14 A-international caps to his credit, his final cap a substitute appearance in a 6–0 win over Taiwan on 19 March 1977.

References

External links
 

Living people
New Zealand association footballers
New Zealand international footballers
Association football midfielders
Year of birth missing (living people)